Church of St Owen is a  Grade I listed church in Bromham, Bedfordshire, England. It became a listed building on 13 July 1964.

The church is a 17th-century building and stands in a parkland setting. There is an alabaster tomb and a triple brass in the chancel.

History

Pre-18th Century 
The north wall dates from the 13th century, while the tower dates from the 15th century.

18th Century 
In 1740, Lord Trevor donated a library collection to the church, which used to be upstairs.

19th Century 
The church's adjoining Dyve chapel was built in 1868. Some window restorations were also made in the same year.

20th Century 
In 1906, a fire badly damaged the church, though repairs were made.

On 13 July 1964 the church became a Grade I listed building.

Architecture
The church has a chancel, a north aisle, and chapel on the north side. There are two-storey porches on both the north and south sides, as well as a west tower and stair turret.

Notable people
 Paula Vennells, serves as a non-stipendiary minister at the church

See also
Grade I listed buildings in Bedfordshire

References

Church of England church buildings in Bedfordshire
Grade I listed churches in Bedfordshire